The 2018 FIFA World Cup qualification UEFA Group I was one of the nine UEFA groups for 2018 FIFA World Cup qualification. The group consisted of six teams: Croatia, Iceland, Ukraine, Turkey, Finland, and Kosovo.

The draw for the first round (group stage) was held as part of the 2018 FIFA World Cup Preliminary Draw on 25 July 2015, starting 18:00 MSK (UTC+3), at the Konstantinovsky Palace in Strelna, Saint Petersburg, Russia. Kosovo was added to the group after the draw, after becoming FIFA members together with Gibraltar in May 2016, and UEFA decided not to put Kosovo in group H together with Bosnia and Herzegovina for security reasons.

The group winners, Iceland, qualified directly for the 2018 FIFA World Cup. The group runners-up, Croatia, advanced to the play-offs as one of the best 8 runners-up. This was the first time Ukraine was eliminated after the first round, as the team had been eliminated in 1998, 2002, 2010 and 2014 after the play-offs, and qualified in 2006.

Standings

Matches
The fixture list prior to the inclusion of Kosovo was confirmed by UEFA on 26 July 2015, the day following the draw. Times are CET/CEST, as listed by UEFA (local times are in parentheses).

Goalscorers
There were 70 goals scored in 30 matches, for an average of  goals per match.

6 goals

 Andriy Yarmolenko

5 goals

 Mario Mandžukić
 Cenk Tosun

4 goals

 Gylfi Sigurðsson

3 goals

 Alfreð Finnbogason
 Artem Kravets

2 goals

 Marcelo Brozović
 Nikola Kalinić
 Andrej Kramarić
 Paulus Arajuuri
 Joel Pohjanpalo
 Teemu Pukki
 Kári Árnason
 Jóhann Berg Guðmundsson
 Hakan Çalhanoğlu
 Volkan Şen
 Ozan Tufan
 Burak Yılmaz

1 goal

 Matej Mitrović
 Ivan Perišić
 Ivan Rakitić
 Domagoj Vida
 Robin Lod
 Alexander Ring
 Pyry Soiri
 Birkir Bjarnason
 Theódór Elmar Bjarnason
 Hörður Björgvin Magnússon
 Björn Bergmann Sigurðarson
 Ragnar Sigurðsson
 Valon Berisha
 Atdhe Nuhiu
 Amir Rrahmani
 Cengiz Ünder
 Artem Besyedin
 Yevhen Konoplyanka
 Ruslan Rotan

1 own goal

 Leart Paqarada (against Ukraine)

Discipline
A player was automatically suspended for the next match for the following offences:
 Receiving a red card (red card suspensions could be extended for serious offences)
 Receiving two yellow cards in two different matches (yellow card suspensions were carried forward to the play-offs, but not the finals or any other future international matches)

The following suspensions were served during the qualifying matches:

Notes

References

External links

Qualifiers – Europe: Round 1, FIFA.com
FIFA World Cup, UEFA.com
Standings – Qualifying round: Group I, UEFA.com

I
Iceland at the 2018 FIFA World Cup
Croatia at the 2018 FIFA World Cup